Tauhara  is a suburb and geothermal area of Taupō in the Waikato region of New Zealand's North Island.

The area's main geographic feature, Mount Tauhara, is culturally significant to local . It is privately owned but has a public walking track and viewing areas, with panoramic views over Lake Taupo, The tracks were closed in 2015 due to vandalism, but later reopened when the vandalism subsequently stopped.

In December 2018 Taupo District Council reduced the speed limit on the main Tauhara Road from 70 km/hr to 50 km/hr, to protect the safety of the area's increasingly urban population.

Demographics

Tauhara had a population of 1,803 at the 2018 New Zealand census, an increase of 264 people (17.2%) since the 2013 census, and an increase of 225 people (14.3%) since the 2006 census. There were 603 households. There were 915 males and 888 females, giving a sex ratio of 1.03 males per female. The median age was 30.4 years (compared with 37.4 years nationally), with 444 people (24.6%) aged under 15 years, 435 (24.1%) aged 15 to 29, 750 (41.6%) aged 30 to 64, and 168 (9.3%) aged 65 or older.

Ethnicities were 66.1% European/Pākehā, 48.8% Māori, 7.2% Pacific peoples, 4.0% Asian, and 1.5% other ethnicities (totals add to more than 100% since people could identify with multiple ethnicities).

The proportion of people born overseas was 9.5%, compared with 27.1% nationally.

Although some people objected to giving their religion, 59.9% had no religion, 25.3% were Christian, 0.3% were Hindu, 0.7% were Buddhist and 6.8% had other religions.

Of those at least 15 years old, 84 (6.2%) people had a bachelor or higher degree, and 330 (24.3%) people had no formal qualifications. The median income was $26,400, compared with $31,800 nationally. The employment status of those at least 15 was that 717 (52.8%) people were employed full-time, 225 (16.6%) were part-time, and 60 (4.4%) were unemployed.

Education

The school opened in 1959.

The college opened in 1976.

The school opened in 1993.

All these schools are co-educational. Rolls are as of

References

Suburbs of Taupō
Populated places in Waikato
Populated places on the Waikato River